Lake Rico is a  freshwater lake within Massasoit State Park in Taunton, Massachusetts. The lake takes up about nearly a quarter of Massasoit State Park. There are many coves, Much of its coastline is heavily forested, although there is a non-designated beach area located at Lake Rico's southeastern coast.

See also 
Massasoit State Park
Taunton, Massachusetts
Taunton River

External links 
City of Taunton's Home Page
City of Taunton's Water Department's Home Page
Massasoit State Park
Taunton River Watershed Alliance
Environmental Protection Agency

Rico
Rico
Rico
Rico